Chaim Yassky (1896–1948) was a physician and medical administrator in Jerusalem. He was killed in the Arab attack on a medical convoy bringing supplies to Hadassah Hospital on Mount Scopus.

Biography
Yassky was born in Kishinev, Imperial Russia in 1896. While studying 
medicine at the University of Odessa, he became active in the Zionist movement.  Before World War I he took part in Jewish self-defense against pogromists in Odessa.

In 1917, after the Russian revolution, he co-founded the Russian Maccabee Society, a Zionist youth organization. 

After World War 1 he worked in a Military Hospital in Odessa, before leaving for Palestine.

In 1920, Yassky immigrated with his wife Fanny (maiden name Gorodetsky) whom he married in Odessa;  to Palestine, where he was appointed district physician of Haifa. 

In 1921, he received a medical degree from Geneva University in Switzerland, after specializing in ophthalmology and in 1927, was appointed acting head of the eye department of the Rothschild-Hadassah Hospital. 

As an ophthalmologist, he initiated programs to eradicate trachoma.  In 1931, Yassky became director of the Hadassah Medical Organization. He was one of the driving spirits behind the establishment of the Rothschild-Hadassah University Hospital on Mount Scopus, which was opened in 1939.

At the start of World War II, Hadassah formed an emergency committee to administer a health program and to cooperate with the allied medical corps of which Dr. Yassky was a committee-member. After the cessation of hostilities, he helped to plan the group's health work.

Yassky was killed in the Hadassah medical convoy massacre on April 13, 1948, during the 1948 Arab-Israeli war, approximately one month before Israel's declaration of independence. A bullet went through his liver and he exsanguinated in about ten minutes.

References

Bibliography
Cornay, Joan (2001). Who's Who in Jewish History. London: Routledge.

External links
Guide to the Hadassah Archives on Long-term Deposit at the American Jewish Historical Society

1896 births
1948 deaths
Russian Jews
Jews in Mandatory Palestine
Israeli ophthalmologists
Russian ophthalmologists
Israeli military doctors
People from Chișinău
Odesa University alumni
Russian Zionists